Timothy William Adcock (born 25 May 1972) is a former English cricketer and current Royal Air Force officer.  In cricket, Adcock was a right-handed batsman who fielded as a wicket-keeper.  He was born in Wegberg, North Rhine-Westphalia, West Germany.

Adcock made his debut for Northumberland in the 1993 Minor Counties Championship against Suffolk.  Adcock played Minor counties cricket for Northumberland from 1993 to 2000, which included 38 Minor Counties Championship matches and 7 MCCA Knockout Trophy matches. He made his only List A appearance against Nottinghamshire in the 1994 NatWest Trophy. In this match, he scored 28 runs before being dismissed by Mark Crawley.

Adcock is a flight lieutenant in the Royal Air Force, where he plays for the Royal Air Force cricket team.

References

External links
Timothy Adcock at ESPNcricinfo
Timothy Adcock at CricketArchive

1972 births
Living people
English cricketers
Northumberland cricketers
Royal Air Force officers
Wicket-keepers